In Kenya under British rule the kipande was an identity document which featured basic personal details, fingerprints, and an employment history. The Native Registration Amendment Ordinance of 1920 made it compulsory for African males above the age of 15. The effect of its adoption was to radically restrict the mobility of Africans. The main intent of the policy, supposedly, was to keep track of the labor pool efficiently. Kipande caused much resentment as all African males were required to wear it at all times around their necks.

The word "Kipande" is also part of some Kenyan place names.

See also
 Pass laws in South Africa

Sources
David Anderson (2000), "Master and Servant in Colonial Kenya", Journal of African History, 41:459-485.
Maxon & Ofcansky (2000), Historical Dictionary of Kenya.

History of Kenya
East Africa Protectorate
Identity documents